Axel's Castle: A Study in the Imaginative Literature of 1870–1930 is a 1931 book of literary criticism by Edmund Wilson on the symbolist movement in literature.

Contents
It includes a brief overview of the movement's origins and chapters on W. B. Yeats, Paul Valéry, T. S. Eliot, Marcel Proust, James Joyce and Gertrude Stein.

The appendices include Tristan Tzara's Memoirs of Dadaism and excerpts from Joyce's then-untitled forthcoming novel Finnegans Wake.

Serialization
Some of the book's chapters were first serialized in The New Republic.

Title
The book's title refers to Axël, a play by Auguste Villiers de l'Isle-Adam which is discussed along with the works of Arthur Rimbaud in the concluding chapter.

External links
New York Times on Axel's Castle
Oxford Journal on Axel's Castle
 Axel's Castle at Internet Archive

1931 non-fiction books
Books of literary criticism
Works originally published in The New Republic
Literature first published in serial form